Karakul (Qarakül) is a rural locality (a village) in Kamyshlinsky Selsoviet, Karmaskalinsky District, Bashkortostan, Russia. The population was 55 as of 2010. There is 1 street.

Geography 
Karakul is located 27 km southeast of Karmaskaly (the district's administrative centre) by road. Malayevo is the nearest rural locality.

References 

Rural localities in Karmaskalinsky District